The following is a list of political parties registered at the Ministry of Interior, Spain, from 1976-2002.

Note that:

 The Ministry does not appear to remove registrations if parties become inactive or are dissolved, and many of the groups no longer exist.
 Some of the groups were actually electoral alliances formed to contest a specific election.
 Some of the groups are regional affiliates or branches of a national party.
 Some of the organizations are actually the youth wings of larger political parties.
 Parties are listed by Spanish name, English name, by city, and in chronological order.
Partido Popular Canario (Canarian People's Party), Santa Cruz de Tenerife, 1977-03-07
Asociación Social Democráta Canaria (Canarian Social Democratic Association), Santa Cruz de Tenerife, 1977-04-29
Partido Social Democráta de la Palma, Gomera y Hierro (Social Democratic Party of La Palma, Gomera and Hierro), Los Llanos de Aridane, 1977-04-29
Partido Socialdemócrata de Tenerife (Social Democratic Party of Tenerife), Santa Cruz de Tenerife, 1977-04-29
Partido Socialista de Canarias (Socialist Party of the Canaries), San Cristóbal de La Laguna, 1977-04-29
Partido de Unificación Comunista en Canarias (Communist Unification Party in the Canaries), San Cristóbal de La Laguna, 1977-09-16
Unión Socialista Obrera Canaria (Canarian Workers Socialist Union), Santa Cruz de Tenerife, 1979-01-13
Frente Regional Canario (Canarian Regional Front), Santa Cruz de Tenerife, 1980-09-24
Asamblea Palmera, Santa Cruz de Tenerife, 1982-05-22
Asamblea Tacorontera (Tacorontian Assembly), Tacoronte, 1982-06-09
Partido Canario de Acción Democrática (Canarian Party of Democratic Action), Santa Cruz de Tenerife, 1982-07-09
Asamblea Gomera (Gomera Assembly), San Sebastian de la Gomera, 1982-07-29
Partido Democráta Liberal de Tenerife (Liberal Democratic Party of Tenerife), Santa Cruz de Tenerife, 1982-09-14
Unión Progresista de Garafia (Progressive Union of Garafia), Garafia, 1982-10-05
Movimiento Autónomo de los Trabajadores (Autonomous Workers Movement), San Cristóbal de La Laguna, 1982-10-08
Siete Estrellas Verdes (Seven Green Stars),  Adeje, 1982-11-03
Unión del Pueblo Canario (Canarian People's Union), Santa Cruz de Tenerife, 1983-01-19
Agrupación Tinerfeña de Independientes (Tenerifean Grouping of Independents), Santa Cruz de Tenerife, 1983-03-01
Unión de Vecinos de Tegueste (Union of Neighbours of Tegueste), Tegueste, 1983-03-15
Frente del Pueblo Canario, Santa Cruz de Tenerife, 1983-03-17
Centro Progresista Popular Canario, Santa Cruz de Tenerife, 1983-03-18
Centro de Estudios Africanos, Tacoronte, 1983-03-23
Izquierda Nacionalista Canaria, San Cristóbal de La Laguna, 1984-01-20
Partido Reformista Democrático de la Provincia de Santa Cruz de Tenerife, Santa Cruz de Tenerife, 1985-01-10
Agrupación Palmera de Independientes, Santa Cruz de la Palma, 1985-01-16
Federación Reformista Canaria, Santa Cruz de Tenerife, 1985-04-23
Agrupación Gomera Independiente, San Sebastian de la Gomera, 1985-06-10
Agrupación Herreña Independiente, Valverde, 1985-06-10
Unión de Nacionalistas de Izquierda, San Cristóbal de La Laguna, 1985-06-13
Partido de la Unión Nacionalista Canaria, Santa Cruz de Tenerife, 1985-10-08
Congreso Nacional de Canarias, Santa Cruz de Tenerife, 1985-11-21

Santa Cruz de Tenerife
Political parties Santa Cruz de Tenerife
Political parties, Santa Cruz de Tenerife